Create/Control is an independent record label based in Brisbane and Sydney, Australia. Create/Control was founded by Paul Piticco.

Operational 
Create/Control is a record label for artists who have the ability to create their own recordings without label funding who will then use the label for distribution, promotion and marketing.
Artists signed to the Create/Control label own 100% ownership and copyright of their work.

In 2013 Create/Control partnered with record labels from Canada and the United States to release each other's recordings.

Discography 
Create/Control's roster includes a variety of bands from outside Australia, including The Smashing Pumpkins, Metric, California Wives and Parquet Courts   as well as a number of Australian artists including PVT, The Jungle Giants, Gung Ho  and Patrick James.
 The Smashing Pumpkins - Oceania
 PVT - Homosapien
 Metric - Synthetica
 Ultraista - Ultraista
 The Jungle Giants - She's A Riot EP
 Opossom - Electric Hawaii
 California Wives - Art History
 Gung Ho - Anywhere Else EP
 Velociraptor - The World Warriors
 The Chemist - Ballet In The Badlands
 Patrick James - All About To Change EP

References

External links 

Soundcloud page

Australian independent record labels
Record labels based in Sydney